This inconclusive battle which took place on 11 April 1712 near Fladstrand, Jylland, between Swedish and Danish forces. It was part of the Great Northern War.

The Swedish fleet, under Sjöblad, consisted of 7 ships with 330 guns, and the Danish fleet, under Knoff, consisted of 5 ships with 158 guns. The battle lasted about 2 hours. Denmark suffered 44 casualties.

Ships involved

Sweden (Sjöblad)
Fredrika 52
Kalmar 46
Stettin 46
Elfsborg 42
Warberg 42/52
Charlotte 38
Stenbock 36

Denmark (Knoff)
Fyen 52
Raae 30
Soridder 28
Leopard 24
Loss 24

References

Conflicts in 1712
Fladstrand
1712 in Denmark